Alexandra Ratcliff (2 October 1948 – 7 April 2019) was an English actress, model and counsellor. She made an impression as a model and film actress in the 1970s, but she became known for being one of the original cast members of the BBC soap opera EastEnders in the 1980s. She portrayed the role of Sue Osman but left the role in 1989. In 2010, she revealed that she had retired from acting to train as a counsellor.

Early life
Ratcliff, the daughter of an insurance salesman, had a turbulent youth. After being expelled from school at age 12, within two years she was heavily smoking cannabis, and she later went on to serve time in prison for selling it. She had numerous jobs before she took up acting, including waitressing, disc-jockeying and performing as a guitarist in the rock groups Tropical Appetite and Escalator.

Career
Ratcliff's career changed direction at 23, when she made a big impression as a model and was cast as "The face of the '70s" by royal photographer Lord Snowdon. This later facilitated a move into film. Her first major role was in the Ken Loach BAFTA-nominated film Family Life (1971), in which she played a schizophrenic teenage girl. This was followed by roles in slightly less well-received films including The Final Programme (1973), Yesterday's Hero (1979) and Hussy (1980) with Helen Mirren. She also appeared in Chris Petit's British road movie Radio On (1979). Ratcliff subsequently acted in several television productions including Minder, Couples, Play for Today, Target, The Sweeney, Shoestring and Shelley, and on stage in 1981 in the Ray Davies/Kinks musical, Chorus Girls.

She became a household name in 1985, as Sue Osman in the BBC serial EastEnders. She played the long-suffering wife of highly-strung cafe owner and mini-cab boss Ali Osman (Nejdet Salih). During her four years in the series, her character contended with cot death, infidelity and finally insanity. Off-screen Ratcliff was struggling with a publicised heroin addiction, and she was written out of the show in 1989.

Her television appearances after EastEnders were in 1992's Maigret opposite Michael Gambon, and in the BBC2 productions A Box of Swan (1990) and Men of the Month (1994).

In later life, Ratcliff retrained as a counsellor, and drove ambulances; in 2010, it was reported she "eke(d) out a living doing part time jobs", and was living "in a run-down ground floor flat on a busy road in North London".

Personal life
Ratcliff married photographer Peter Wright in Kensington, London in 1968. They broke up and by 1973 she had her only son, William, by theatre director Terence Palmer.

In 1991, her then boyfriend Michael Shorey stood trial at the Old Bailey after he was accused of killing two women. Despite Ratcliff giving him an alibi (she claimed in the witness box that they were making love at the time) he was found guilty and is now serving two life sentences for murder. His court case was to be her last public appearance.

In later life, Ratcliff no longer used heroin and lived on a £70 a week disability allowance. She suffered three strokes and was diagnosed with cancer.

Death
Ratcliff died in her sleep and her body was found on 7 April 2019. She was 70 years old. In October 2019, the coroner's court attributed her death to taking an excessive amount of morphine due to a terminal lung condition.

Filmography

References

External links 
 
Sandy Ratcliff at the British Film Institute

1948 births
English soap opera actresses
English television actresses
English film actresses
2019 deaths
Actresses from London
20th-century English actresses